An ammunition dump, ammunition supply point (ASP), ammunition handling area (AHA) or ammunition depot is a military storage facility for live ammunition and explosives.

The storage of live ammunition and explosives is inherently hazardous. There is the potential for accidents in the unloading, packing, and transfer of ammunition. Great care is taken in handling these dangerous explosives so as not to harm personnel or nearby ammunition.

Despite the intensive preventive measures they get, ammunition depots around the world suffer from non-combat fires and explosions. Although this is a rare occurrence, there are devastating consequences when it does happen. Usually, an ammunition depot experiencing even minor explosions in one of its sites/buildings is immediately evacuated together with surrounding civilian areas. Thus, all of the stored ammunition is left to detonate itself completely for days or weeks, with very limited attempts at firefighting from a safe distance. If the ammunitions are artillery shells and other heavy types, the whole depot site affected is typically leveled.

Typical elements

The typical ammo dump will have several of the following elements:

A buffer zone or cleared area of at least several hundred feet (sometimes as much as ) surrounding the facility, in the event of an explosion.
Perimeter security, such as a fence, to avoid casual access by unauthorized persons.
Guards equipped and in numbers relative to the potential threat from enemy forces.
Bunkers (sometimes referred to as igloos), or magazines, where ammunition is stored under lock and key.
Blast barriers (traverses), such as an earth berm or buried pit, to divert the force of the blast (typically upward, but sometimes to the side) in case the ammunition detonates.
Safety distances are calculated between storage sites (magazines) and outside infrastructure to limit damage and set maximum holdings of net explosive content per site.
A loading area (transit building or area) for transferring stored ammunition to and from trucks, ships, railway wagons, etc.
A flooding system in large facilities to put out a fire or prevent an explosion in a magazine.
An ammunition repair facility or workshop, or maintenance inspection (M&I) will be found in many ammunition facilities.  This facility is used for the repair, breakdown, inspection, and manufacture of ammunition held within or brought to the depot.
A destruction area or demolition range used for the disposal by burning or detonation of defective, surplus, or obsolete ammunition and explosives.
A missile shop specialised in inspection and repair of missiles, and pre-assembly of missile type weapons before being sent to the front line.

Field sites

Ammunition dump as a term is more commonly ascribed to sites that store munitions "in the field" for imminent or immediate use. These are often targets for enemy artillery attack or air attack.

See also
 Armory (military)
 Central Ammunition Depot (disambiguation)
 Emergency management
 Powder tower
 Royal Air Force munitions storage during World War II
 Royal Naval Armaments Depot
 Supply depot
 Weapon storage area

References

External links

International Ammunition Technical Guidelines UN Office of Safe Disarmament
  Rapport OSPAR sur les munitions immergées – (Map page 9 for Europe an OSPAR zone)  Overview of Past Dumping at Sea of Chemical Weapons and Munitions in the OSPAR Maritime Area, 2005  / (pdf)  OSPAR
 Rapport OSPAR / Évaluation 1998 – 2006 (see page 62 and more..)

 
Military logistics